Jeanine M. Notter is an American politician serving as a member of the New Hampshire House of Representatives from the Hillsborough 21st district. She assumed office in 2010.

Notter was first elected to the New Hampshire House of Representatives in 2010 and was chosen as House majority whip in 2021. Before going into politics Notter was a fitness trainer. Notter is a Republican.

Career 
Notter was first elected to the New Hampshire House of Representatives in 2010 and was chosen as House majority whip in 2021. Notter is a Republican. She is a member of the House Science, Technology and Energy Committee. Since 2006, Notter has also hosted a public access television show called Chattin' with Jeanine.

References 

Living people
Republican Party members of the New Hampshire House of Representatives
Women state legislators in New Hampshire
Year of birth missing (living people)
21st-century American women